Philip or Philippe, Duke of Brabant may refer to:

 Philip I, Duke of Brabant (1427–1430), also known as Philip of Saint Pol
 Philip II, Duke of Brabant (1430–1467), also known as Philip the Good or Philip III, Duke of Burgundy
 Philip III, Duke of Brabant (1494–1506), also known as Philip the Handsome and later also named King Philip I of Castile
 Philip IV, Duke of Brabant (1555–1598), further known as King Philip II of Spain
 Philip V, Duke of Brabant (1621-1665), further known as King Philip III of Portugal and King Philip IV of Spain
 Philip VI, Duke of Brabant (1700-1706), further known as King Philip V of Spain or Philippe of Anjou
 Prince Philippe, Duke of Brabant (1993–2013), further known as King Philippe of Belgium